Jocelyn I de Courtenay (1034-after 1069), son of Athon, Châtelain de Châteaurenard, Seigneur de Courtenay.  Very little is known about his life other than his two marriages.  He first married Hildegarde de Château-Landon, daughter of Geoffrey II, Count of Gâtinais, and Ermengarde of Anjou (daughter of Fulk III, Count of Anjou).  Joscelin and Hildegarde had one daughter:
 Vaindemonde de Courtenay, married to Renard II, Count of Joigny.

Joscelin married secondly Elizabeth of Montlhéry, daughter of Guy I of Montlhéry and Hodierna of Gometz.  Joscelin and Elizabeth had five children:
 Hodierne of Courtenay, married to Geoffroy II, Seigneur of Joinville
 Miles, Seigneur of Courtenay, married Ermengarde of Nevers
 Joscelin I, Count of Edessa and Prince of Galilee
 Geoffroy of Courtney (d. 1139)
 Renaud (d. before 1133), Monk at the monastery of St. John the Evangelist at Sens.

After Joscelin’s death, Elizabeth became a nun at St. John’s.  See also House of Courtenay.

Sources 
 Saunier-Seité, Alice, Les Courtenay, Éditions France-Empire, 1998
 Riley-Smith, Johathan, The First Crusaders, 1095-1131, Cambridge University Press, London, 1997
 La Monte, John L., The Lords of Le Puiset on the Crusades, Speculum, 1942
 Jim Bradbury, 'Fulk le Réchin and the Origin of the Plantagenets', Studies in Medieval History Presented to R. Allen Brown, Ed. * Christopher Harper-Bill, Christopher J. Holdsworth, Janet L. Nelson, The Boydell Press, 1989

Joscelin
1034 births
Year of death uncertain